Helastia ohauensis is a moth of the family Geometridae. This species is endemic to New Zealand.

References

Moths of New Zealand
Endemic fauna of New Zealand
Moths described in 1987
Cidariini
Taxa named by Robin Craw
Endemic moths of New Zealand